"The Prisoner of White Agony Creek" is a 2006 Scrooge McDuck comic by Don Rosa. The story takes place between "King of the Klondike" and "Hearts of the Yukon" in the series The Life and Times of Scrooge McDuck making it part 8B. The story shows how Goldie O'Gilt was taken to Scrooge's claim by the White Agony Creek. As Don Rosa announced his retirement in June 2008, this is his last story to date.

The story was first published in the Danish Anders And & Co. #2006-22; the first American publication was in The Life and Times of Scrooge McDuck Companion collection in 2006.

Plot
While helping to tidy the Money Bin, Huey, Dewey and Louie notice an old steamer trunk of Scrooge McDuck's keepsakes, and ask him what his most valuable possession is. Donald guesses that it is his Number One Dime, while one of the boys guesses the Goose Egg Nugget. The boys remember that Scrooge told them (in "Back to the Klondike") how the Nugget was stolen from him, and he retrieved it from Goldie O'Gilt, then took her to his claim and forced her to mine gold to show her how hard miners work to earn their living. The boys realize that Goldie was on Scrooge's claim for a whole month, but Scrooge never told them what happened during that month. This plunges Scrooge into a memory:

In 1897, during the Klondike Gold Rush, Scrooge forces Goldie to walk to his claim in White Agony Creek. She pretends to agree, plotting to re-steal his Goose Egg Nugget and the deed to his claim, once she finds out where he keeps them. In the days that follow, they gradually come to respect each other's toughness (though they refuse to admit it to themselves, let alone each other). When a wild bear seizes Goldie by the hair, Scrooge throws his bowie knife, severing a lock of her hair and scaring the bear away.

Meanwhile, Soapy Slick, still exiled from Canada after the events of "The King of the Klondike", sends three famous lawmen - Wyatt Earp, Bat Masterson, and Judge Roy Bean - to rescue Goldie from Scrooge, painting him as an unscrupulous kidnapper. But when they arrive, Goldie doesn't want to be rescued (since she doesn't yet have the Nugget or the deed).  Scrooge outfoxes the three "legends" of the West, much to Goldie's enthrallment. At the same time, Butch Cassidy and the Sundance Kid, also recruited by Soapy, kidnap Goldie and steal Scrooge's strongbox, holding both the Nugget and the deed. But Scrooge eventually rescues Goldie and gets his strongbox back. When Goldie points out that the outlaws' dog sled is about to go over a waterfall, and he must rescue "them", Scrooge agrees, dashes back, and cuts the dogs loose, leaving Butch and Sundance to go over the falls. The ice floes dislodged by the fight hurtle downriver and wreck Soapy's riverboat. After matching wits with Scrooge, Butch and Sundance resolve to leave not just Canada, but all of North America behind and seek safer opportunities in South America. 

Returning to Scrooge's claim, Goldie discombobulates Scrooge with a kiss (which leaves her almost as discombobulated), allowing Earp, Masterson, and Bean to knock him unconscious. Goldie eagerly opens his strongbox, finding both the Nugget and the deed. Remembering that Scrooge spent hours every night gazing at something inside the box that was even more valuable to him, she eagerly opens the folded piece of paper, and sees that it is the severed lock of her hair. When the three lawmen call for her to join them on their return trip, she refuses to go.

The next morning, Scrooge awakens in a panic, believing that Goldie is long gone with his strongbox, but is surprised to see she is still in his cabin, fixing breakfast for him. Believing she is still after his valuables, he accuses her of drugging his food again and refuses to touch it. In a fury, Goldie kisses him again, then punches him. Waiting outside, the three lawmen listen to the sounds of a furious fight, which tapers off into a silence that lasts through the day and the night (surprisingly for a Disney comics story, the scene implies a sexual tryst between Scrooge and Goldie). The next day, Scrooge reluctantly tells Goldie that she has to leave, since her being with there is dangerous for both of them. In a reprise of a panel from "Back to the Klondike", Scrooge pays her her wages for her month of work, which she throws back in his face and stomps off, declaring she dug more gold than he did - careful to keep her back to Scrooge so he can't see the tears in her eyes.

Back in the present, Donald and his nephews ask Scrooge to confirm whether his money bin, his Number One Dime, the Goose Egg Nugget, or Castle McDuck back in Scotland is his most valuable possession. Scrooge looks down at the lock of Goldie's hair, which he still has after so many years, smiles fondly, and simply says, "no".

External links

Fiction set in 1897
2006 in comics
Prisoner of White Agony Creek, the
Klondike Gold Rush in fiction
Comics set in the 19th century
Comics set in Yukon
Cultural depictions of Wyatt Earp
Cultural depictions of Bat Masterson
Cultural depictions of Butch Cassidy and the Sundance Kid
Cultural depictions of Roy Bean
Disney comics stories
The Life and Times of Scrooge McDuck